The Wolf River is a river on Vancouver Island in Strathcona Regional District, British Columbia, Canada. It is in the Pacific Ocean drainage basin, and lies entirely within Strathcona Provincial Park.

Course
The river begins at Schjelderup Lake and heads north, then turns northeast below Mount Con Reid to reach its mouth on the west side of Buttle Lake, the source of the Campbell River.

Recreation
There are two campgrounds on either side of the river mouth at Buttle Lake: Titus Marine Campground on the north side and Wolf River Marine Campground on the south side.

See also  
List of rivers of British Columbia

References

Rivers of Vancouver Island
Mid Vancouver Island
Nootka Land District